"Heaven Only Knows" is a song written by Paul Kennerley, and recorded by American country music singer Emmylou Harris.  It was released in April 1989 as the second single from the album Bluebird.  The song reached Number 16 on the Billboard Hot Country Singles & Tracks chart.

Chart performance

In popular culture 

 The song is repeatedly featured in S5E1 of The Sopranos "Two Tonys"

References

1989 singles
Emmylou Harris songs
Songs written by Paul Kennerley
Reprise Records singles
1989 songs